born October 21, 1972, is a Japanese singer-songwriter and record producer originally from Toyonaka, Osaka. Known as "Yone" to fans, Toshinori made his major label debut with the single "Mikan no Android" in 1992 on Geneon Entertainment. Aside from his own music career, Yonekura has crafted songs for some of Japan's best known acts such as KinKi Kids, Hiromi Go, Akiko Wada, and SMAP. In 2008, he made his first foray into acting joining the Japanese production of the Broadway musical, Rent.

Discography

Albums

Studio albums

Compilation albums

Remix albums

Cover albums

Live albums

Extended plays

Singles

References

External links
 Toshinori Yonekura Official Website
 UMG Official Website
 WMG Official Website

1972 births
Living people
People from Toyonaka, Osaka
Japanese male pop singers
Musicians from Osaka Prefecture
21st-century Japanese singers
21st-century Japanese male singers